Crybaby, Cry-Baby, CryBaby or Cry Baby may refer to:

Music 
None

Albums 
 Cry Baby (Garnet Mimms album), 1963
 Cry Baby (Melanie Martinez album), 2015
 The Crybaby, a 2000 album by the American rock band Melvins
 Crybaby (Lil Peep mixtape), 2016
 Crybaby (Tegan and Sara album), 2022

Songs 
 "Cry Baby" (Garnet Mimms song), 1963, also recorded by Janis Joplin in 1970
 "Cry Baby" (Jemini song), 2003
 "Cry Baby" (Cee Lo Green song), 2010
 "Cry Baby" (Megan Thee Stallion song), 2020
 "Cry Baby" (Melanie Martinez song), 2015
 "Cry Baby" (Official Hige Dandism song), 2021
 "Crybaby" (Mariah Carey song), 2000
 "Crybaby" (Paloma Faith song), 2017
 "Cry Baby", by the Bonnie Sisters, 1956
 "Cry Baby", by Kix from Midnite Dynamite, 1985
 "Cry Baby", by Stray Cats from Choo Choo Hot Fish, 1992
 "Cry Baby", by Cheap Trick from Woke Up with a Monster, 1994
 "Cry Baby", by the Neighbourhood from Wiped Out!, 2015
 "Cry Baby", by Demi Lovato from Tell Me You Love Me, 2017
 "Cry Baby", by Lizzo from Cuz I Love You, 2019
 "Cry Baby", by MacKenzie Porter, 2019
 "Cry Baby", by Reks from Grey Hairs, 2008
 "Crybaby", by Utopia from Oblivion, 1984

Other uses 
 Cry-Baby, a 1990 film by John Waters
 Cry-Baby (musical), a 2007 musical adaptation of the 1990 film
 Cry Baby, the protagonist of Melanie Martinez’s film K-12
 Cry Baby (gum), a brand of sour bubble gum
 Dunlop Cry Baby, a wah-wah effects guitar pedal

See also 

 Cry Baby Cry (disambiguation)